Postiglione is a surname. Notable people with the surname include:

Corey Postiglione (born 1942), American artist, art critic and educator
Francesco Postiglione (born 1972), Italian swimmer and water polo player 
Luca Postiglione (1876–1936), Italian painter
Raffaele Postiglione (1818-1897), Italian painter
Salvatore Postiglione (1861–1906), Italian painter